All That I Am is the fifth album by Deborah Allen and released by Giant Records in 1994.

Track listing

Track information and credits taken from the album's liner notes.

Musicians
Lead vocals: Deborah Allen
Drums: Dony Wynn
Bass: Glenn Worf
Keyboards: Bill Cuomo, Steve Nathan
Acoustic guitar: Larry Byrom, Al Anderson
Electric guitar: Greg Foresman, Dan Huff, Bill "Cab" McDermott
6 string bass guitar: Dan Huff
Steel/Lap steel: Dan Dugmore
Fiddle: Tammy Rogers
Mandolin: Mary Ann Kennedy
Background vocals: Deborah Allen, Mary Ann Kennedy, Billy Burnette

Production
Produced by James Stroud, Deborah Allen
Recorded by Lynn Peterzell, Julian King
Assistant engineer: Mark Hagen
Mixing by Lynn Peterzell
Mastered by Denny Purcell
A&R Direction by Michelle Payne, Abbe Nameche
Production assistants: Abbe Nameche, Doug Rich
Production coordinators: Michelle Payne, Anna Mitchell

References

External links
Deborah Allen Official Site
Giant Records Official Site

1994 albums
Deborah Allen albums
Giant Records (Warner) albums